Gu Bingfeng (born 25 January 1994) is a Chinese field hockey player for the Chinese national team.

She participated at the 2018 Women's Hockey World Cup.

References

External links
 

1994 births
Living people
Chinese female field hockey players
Sportspeople from Liaoning
Field hockey players at the 2018 Asian Games
Asian Games bronze medalists for China
Asian Games medalists in field hockey
Medalists at the 2018 Asian Games
Field hockey players at the 2020 Summer Olympics
Olympic field hockey players of China
21st-century Chinese women